Meroptera abditiva is a species of snout moth in the genus Meroptera. It was described by Carl Heinrich in 1956, and is known from North America, including Illinois, Maryland, New Brunswick, Ohio and Quebec.

References

Moths described in 1956
Phycitinae